SocialFlow is a social media optimization platform for brands and publishers. The company uses data from Twitter firehose, a link proxy, and proprietary algorithms, to try and improve the delivery of messages on social networks.  Analysis and data visualization by the company of the way news filtered out around the death of Osama bin Laden via Twitter received international news coverage  and led to questions about the role of Twitter in journalism.

SocialFlow is associated with Betaworks, a New York-based venture capital company, headquartered in New York City. On February 10, 2022, it was announced that SocialFlow had been acquired by digital experience platform Piano Software Inc.

History

Early history

SocialFlow was founded in early 2009 by Frank Speiser and Mike Perrone, who sought to apply a scientific approach to the task of building and sustaining engaged social media audiences at scale.

In 2013, SocialFlow was targeted by the Syrian Electronic Army, a hacking and cyber-criminal group organized in 2011 to support Syrian President Bashar al-Assad during the Syrian civil war. The group gained access to SocialFlow’s social media accounts after sending a phishing email to the company’s employees. The attack resulted in the brief takedown of SocialFlow’s website and publishing platform that lasted about 20 minutes. To promote internet security and account protection, SocialFlow published a detailed account of the hack and their security response in a blog post.

Investors

SocialFlow announced April 7, 2011, that they had raised $7 million in Series A funding. The Series A round was led by Softbank, with Softbank NY, RRE Ventures, betaworks, Highline Venture Partners, AOL Venture Partners, SV Angel and a group of high profile angel investors participating. On April 16, 2013, SocialFlow announced they raised $10 million round in Series B funding. Fairhaven Capital led the round and was joined by existing investors SoftBank Capital, RRE Ventures, AOL Ventures and Betaworks, as well as new investors kbs+ Ventures and Rand Capital Corporation.

Acquisition 
On February 10, 2022, it was announced that SocialFlow had been acquired by digital experience platform Piano Software Inc. for an undisclosed amount. The transaction is a cash purchase, with funding provided by Updata Partners, Rittenhouse Ventures and Sixth Street Partners, and results in Piano acquiring 100% of the shares of SocialFlow.

Corporate affairs 
The company announced June 7, 2011, that Peter Hershberg joined the company as President.

Research
SocialFlow gained considerable media attention when it published "Breaking Bin Laden: Visualizing the Power of a Single Tweet". The study demonstrated how Twitter had evolved into a primary news source, as the death of Osama bin Laden broke on Twitter.

Their next study "Engaging News-Hungry Audiences Tweet by Tweet" looked at the Twitter audiences of Al-Jazeera English, BBC News, CNN, The Economist, Fox News and New York Times and revealed the similarities and differences between each respective organization's audience, while simultaneously demonstrating the true value of audience engagement.

Another notable study created by SocialFlow looked at the launch of the KONY 2012 video through social media. As noted by Forbes writer Anthony Kosner, a study by the SocialFlow research group showed that, rather than emerging from big liberal enclaves on the American coasts, the initial wave of social media traffic that launched the KONY 2012 video originated in mid-sized, relatively conservative cities in middle America.

References

External links
 

Search engine optimization
Digital marketing
Software companies based in New York (state)
Web analytics
Marketing companies established in 2009
Marketing companies of the United States
Defunct software companies of the United States
2009 establishments in New York City